Anthony Colón (born February 24, 1952) is a retired Puerto Rican middle-distance runner. He competed at the 1972 Summer Olympics and 1976 Summer Olympics in the 1500 metres.

Running career
Colón attended high school at Power Memorial Academy, where he ran cross country and track. By the time he graduated from PMA, he recorded personal-bests of 4:06.0 in the mile and 1:52.8 in the 880 yards. At Manhattan College, he ran track for the Jaspers. Along with Michael Keogh, Colón won the team 1973 NCAA Men's Division I Indoor Track and Field Championships and was part of the distance medley relay championship team.

References 

1953 births
Living people
Puerto Rican male middle-distance runners
Olympic track and field athletes of Puerto Rico
Athletes (track and field) at the 1972 Summer Olympics
Athletes (track and field) at the 1976 Summer Olympics
Manhattan Jaspers track and field athletes